The 2005 WNBA season was the eighth for the Washington Mystics. The Mystics gave it their all, but they fell short for the playoffs, losing a tiebreaker to the Detroit Shock.

Offseason

WNBA Draft

Regular season

Season standings

Season schedule

Player stats

Awards and honors
Temeka Johnson, WNBA Rookie of the Year Award

References

External links
Mystics on Basketball Reference

Washington Mystics seasons
Washington
Washington Mystics